Spring Creek is an unincorporated community in Warren County, Tennessee, United States.

References

Unincorporated communities in Warren County, Tennessee
Unincorporated communities in Tennessee